Boonton Township  is a township in Morris County, in the U.S. state of New Jersey. As of the 2020 United States census, the township's population was 4,380, an increase of 117 (2.7%) from the 2010 census count of 4,263, which in turn reflected a decline of 24 (−0.6%) from 4,287 in the 2000 census.

Boonton Township was incorporated by an act of the New Jersey Legislature on April 11, 1867, from portions of Pequannock Township. The borough of Mountain Lakes was formed from portions of the township on March 3, 1924. The settlement was originally called "Boone-Towne" in 1761 in honor of the Colonial Governor Thomas Boone.

New Jersey Monthly magazine ranked Boonton Township as the 4th best place to live in the state in its rankings of the "New Jersey's Top Towns 2011–2012.

History 
Boonton Township's recorded history began about 1710 when William Penn, the Quaker land speculator, located in the northern valley his Lot No. 48, which contained  of fields and woodlands. James Bollen, whose bordering "plantation" stretching south toward the Tourne was described as "situate on the fork of Rockaway with an Indian plantation in it," mapped his 1,507 acres (6 km2) in 1715. In 1765 David Ogden purchased from Burnet and Skinner the Great Boonton Tract. When the Township of Boonton was created as of April 11, 1867 by "An Act to Divide the Township of Pequannoc in the County of Morris" most of Penn's Lot No. 48 and parts of the Bollen and Great Boonton Tracts fell within Boonton's boundary.

The first settler of proper record was Frederick DeMouth of French Huguenot extraction. By 1758, his Rockaway Valley plantation within the Penn Lot covered , and it was on this land that the large Stickle, Bott and Kincaid farms were to prosper in the far distant future. Frederick Miller of German Palatine birth bought extensive land (later day Dixon acres) within the Bollen piece at 13 shillings per acre. These founding families were closely followed by the Hoplers, Van Winkles, Cooks, Scotts, Peers, Stickles and Kanouses.

McCaffrey Lane, the oldest recorded thoroughfare in the area, was built in 1767 by Samuel Ogden of the Great Boonton Tract. In 1822, North Main Street was "cut" along the proposed Morris Canal route. In 1824, the Morris Canal and Banking Company was chartered with John Scott of Powerville, an important commissioner. Lock Numbers 9, 10 and 11 were constructed in newly named Powerville. The Powerville Hotel, still standing, was built near Lock Number 11 to accommodate both canal and transient trade. It later gained fame as a pre-American Civil War Underground Railroad station.

Geography 

According to the United States Census Bureau, the township had a total area of 8.50 square miles (22.01 km2), including 8.12 square miles (21.04 km2) of land and 0.38 square miles (0.97 km2) of water (4.41%).

Unincorporated communities, localities and place names located partially or completely within the township include Deer Pond, Dixons Pond, Powerville, Rockaway Valley and Sheep Hill.

The township borders the Morris County municipalities of Boonton, Denville Township, Kinnelon, Montville, Mountain Lakes and Rockaway Township.

Demographics

Census 2010 

The Census Bureau's 2006–2010 American Community Survey showed that (in 2010 inflation-adjusted dollars) median household income was $117,333 (with a margin of error of ± $21,364) and the median family income was $135,781 (± $33,990). Males had a median income of $102,250 (± $17,348) versus $62,452 (± $17,486) for females. The per capita income for the township was $61,267 (± $12,232). About 3.8% of families and 3.4% of the population were below the poverty line, including 1.6% of those under age 18 and none of those age 65 or over.

Based on data from the 2006–2010 American Community Survey, Boonton Township had a per capita income of $61,267 (ranked 50th in the state), compared to per capita income in Morris County of $47,342 and statewide of $34,858.

Census 2000 
As of the 2000 United States census there were 4,287 people, 1,476 households, and 1,157 families residing in the township.  The population density was 508.9 people per square mile (196.6/km2).  There were 1,510 housing units at an average density of 179.2 per square mile (69.2/km2).  The racial makeup of the township was 93.00% White, 1.19% African American, 0.05% Native American, 4.08% Asian, 0.63% from other races, and 1.05% from two or more races. Hispanic or Latino of any race were 2.15% of the population.

There were 1,476 households, out of which 36.7% had children under the age of 18 living with them, 70.1% were married couples living together, 5.2% had a female householder with no husband present, and 21.6% were non-families. 17.5% of all households were made up of individuals, and 7.6% had someone living alone who was 65 years of age or older.  The average household size was 2.78 and the average family size was 3.18.

In the township the population was spread out, with 24.9% under the age of 18, 4.9% from 18 to 24, 27.0% from 25 to 44, 28.4% from 45 to 64, and 14.9% who were 65 years of age or older.  The median age was 42 years. For every 100 females, there were 98.6 males.  For every 100 females age 18 and over, there were 93.3 males.

The median income for a household in the township was $91,753, and the median income for a family was $102,944. Males had a median income of $77,133 versus $46,302 for females. The per capita income for the township was $45,014.  About 0.9% of families and 1.3% of the population were below the poverty line, including 0.5% of those under age 18 and 2.2% of those age 65 or over.

Government

Local government 

Boonton Township is governed under the Township form of New Jersey municipal government, one of 141 municipalities (of the 564) statewide that use this form, the second-most commonly used form of government in the state. The Township Committee is comprised of five members, who are elected directly by the voters at-large in partisan elections to serve three-year terms of office on a staggered basis, with either one or two seats coming up for election each year as part of the November general election in a three-year cycle. At an annual reorganization meeting held in January after each election, a Mayor (formally described as Chairperson) and Deputy Mayor are selected by the Township Committee from among its members.

, members of the Boonton Township Committee are Mayor Paul Allieri (R, term on committee and as mayor ends December 31, 2022), Deputy Mayor Brian Honan (R, term on committee ends 2023; term as deputy mayor ends 2022), Thomas R. Donadio (R, 2023), William Klingener (R, 2022) and Thomas F. SanFilippo, Jr. (R, 2024).

Patricia Collins was chosen in January 2020 by the Township Committee from a list of three candidates nominated by the Republican municipal committee to fill the seat expiring in December 2021 that had been held by Michele Rankin until her resignation from office effective in December 2019.

In December 2018, the Township Committee selected Brian Honan from a list of candidates submitted by the Republican municipal committee to fill the seat expiring in December 2020 that had been vacated the previous month by Robert A. Rizzo, who resigned from office; Honan served on an interim basis until the November 2019 general election, when he was elected to serve the balance of the term of office.

Federal, state and county representation 
Boonton Township is located in the 11th Congressional District and is part of New Jersey's 25th state legislative district.

 

Morris County is governed by a Board of County Commissioners comprised of seven members who are elected at-large in partisan elections to three-year terms on a staggered basis, with either one or three seats up for election each year as part of the November general election. Actual day-to-day operation of departments is supervised by County Administrator, John Bonanni. , Morris County's Commissioners are
Commissioner Director Tayfun Selen (R, Chatham Township, term as commissioner ends December 31, 2023; term as director ends 2022),
Commissioner Deputy Director John Krickus (R, Washington Township, term as commissioner ends 2024; term as deputy director ends 2022),
Douglas Cabana (R, Boonton Township, 2022),
Kathryn A. DeFillippo (R, Roxbury, 2022),
Thomas J. Mastrangelo (R, Montville, 2022),
Stephen H. Shaw (R, Mountain Lakes, 2024) and
Deborah Smith (R, Denville, 2024).
The county's constitutional officers are the County Clerk and County Surrogate (both elected for five-year terms of office) and the County Sheriff (elected for a three-year term). , they are
County Clerk Ann F. Grossi (R, Parsippany–Troy Hills, 2023),
Sheriff James M. Gannon (R, Boonton Township, 2022) and
Surrogate Heather Darling (R, Roxbury, 2024).

Elections 
As of March 23, 2011, there were a total of 3,061 registered voters in Boonton Township, of which 558 (18.2%) were registered as Democrats, 1,386 (45.3%) were registered as Republicans and 1,114 (36.4%) were registered as Unaffiliated. There were 3 voters registered as Libertarians or Greens.

In the 2012 presidential election, Republican Mitt Romney received 61.4% of the vote (1,430 cast), ahead of Democrat Barack Obama with 37.4% (870 votes), and other candidates with 1.2% (28 votes), among the 2,341 ballots cast by the township's 3,185 registered voters (13 ballots were spoiled), for a turnout of 73.5%. In the 2008 presidential election, Republican John McCain received 59.2% of the vote (1,439 cast), ahead of Democrat Barack Obama with 39.0% (949 votes) and other candidates with 1.1% (27 votes), among the 2,431 ballots cast by the township's 3,199 registered voters, for a turnout of 76.0%. In the 2004 presidential election, Republican George W. Bush received 62.4% of the vote (1,480 ballots cast), outpolling Democrat John Kerry with 36.3% (860 votes) and other candidates with 0.8% (25 votes), among the 2,372 ballots cast by the township's 3,083 registered voters, for a turnout percentage of 76.9.

In the 2013 gubernatorial election, Republican Chris Christie received 75.3% of the vote (1,077 cast), ahead of Democrat Barbara Buono with 23.2% (332 votes), and other candidates with 1.5% (22 votes), among the 1,454 ballots cast by the township's 3,199 registered voters (23 ballots were spoiled), for a turnout of 45.5%. In the 2009 gubernatorial election, Republican Chris Christie received 64.9% of the vote (1,126 ballots cast), ahead of Democrat Jon Corzine with 27.7% (480 votes), Independent Chris Daggett with 6.2% (107 votes) and other candidates with 0.7% (12 votes), among the 1,735 ballots cast by the township's 3,131 registered voters, yielding a 55.4% turnout.

Education 
The Boonton Township School District serves students in public school for pre-kindergarten through eighth grade at Rockaway Valley School. As of the 2020–21 school year, the district, comprised of one school, had an enrollment of 387 students and 44.0 classroom teachers (on an FTE basis), for a student–teacher ratio of 8.8:1.

For ninth through twelfth grades, public school students attend Mountain Lakes High School, in Mountain Lakes, as part of a sending/receiving relationship agreement in place with the Mountain Lakes Schools. As of the 2020–21 school year, the high school had an enrollment of 641 students and 62.9 classroom teachers (on an FTE basis), for a student–teacher ratio of 10.2:1.

Transportation 

No Interstate, U.S. or state highways pass through Boonton Township. The most significant road directly serving the township is County Route 511. However, Interstate 287 and U.S. Route 202 are accessible in neighboring municipalities.

Notable people 

People who were born in, residents of, or otherwise closely associated with Boonton Township include:
 Anthony M. Bucco (born 1962), member of the New Jersey General Assembly from the New Jersey's 25th legislative district
 Anthony R. Bucco (1938–2019), member of the New Jersey Senate who represented the 25th Legislative District from 1998 until his death
 John H. Dorsey (1937–2018), attorney and politician who served in the New Jersey Legislature from 1976 to 1994
 Mike Michalowicz (born 1970), author and entrepreneur
 Kelly Tripucka (born 1959), former professional basketball player who played for ten seasons in the NBA
 Travis Tripucka (born 1989), long snapper who was signed by the St. Louis Rams as an undrafted free agent in 2012, and is the son of Kelly Tripucka

References

External links 

Boonton Township website
Boonton Township Public Schools

School Data for the Boonton Township School District, National Center for Education Statistics
Daily Record area newspaper
Photos of Boonton Township on Flickr

 
1867 establishments in New Jersey
Populated places established in 1867
Populated places on the Underground Railroad
Township form of New Jersey government
Townships in Morris County, New Jersey